The 2014 Men's Volleyball Division 2 is the highest level of Thailand club volleyball in the 2014 season and the 4th edition.

Team
  3 Orchids–Makkasan VC
  IAM CMU VC
  Maejo University VC
  MTB. 11–Chainat VC
  Phetchaburi VC
  Sanpawut–Saraburi–Thai-Denmark VC
  Wing 46 Toyota-Phitsanulok

Ranking

|}

Note
Grading 2014 Men's Volleyball Division 2 Standings following order.

1. Teams win most matches.
2. Winning matches equally. Team with an overall win - win (3-0,3-1 win team win 3 points, loser no points, winning 3-2 team win 2 points, the losing team 1 point).
3. Overall lost - win ratio set as well.
4. Ratio set up / set the ratio equal to all points.
5. Teams ranked 1-2 to advance to the Volleyball Thailand League.

Preliminary round

|}

Final standing

External links
Table Competition

2014
2014 in Thai sport